Rosa Vergés i Coma (born 22 February 1955) is a Spanish film and television director and screenwriter.

Life and career 
Born in Barcelona, the daughter of publisher  and actress Silvia Morgan, Vergés studied art history at the University of Barcelona and at University of Paris. After brief experiences as a model and a stage actress, she started her career as a scriptwriter and an assistant director, collaborating among others with Bigas Luna and Vicente Aranda. Before her feature film debut, she directed shorts, commercials and corporate videos. 

Vergés  made her film debut in 1990 with Baby Boom, which premiered in the Critic's Week section of the 47th Venice International Film Festival  and got her the Goya for Best New Director. Her following film Souvenir, a comedy about the interracial romance between a Japanese man and a Spanish woman, was a commercial success.

Selected filmography 
 Boom boom (1990) 
 Souvenir (1994) 
 Tic Tac (1997) 
 Iris  (2004)

References

External links 
 

1955 births
Living people
Spanish women screenwriters 
Spanish women film directors
People from Barcelona